How've You Bean? is a 1933 American Pre-Code comedy film starring Fatty Arbuckle, the last short film released before his death.

Cast
 Roscoe 'Fatty' Arbuckle as Abner
 Jean Hubert
 Fritz Hubert as Willie
 Mildred Van Dorn as The Bride
 Edmund Elton as The Mayor
 Dora Mills Adams as Mother of the Groom
 Paul Clare
 Charles Howard
 Herbert Warren

See also
 Fatty Arbuckle filmography

External links

1933 films
1933 short films
1933 comedy films
American black-and-white films
Films directed by Alfred J. Goulding
Vitaphone short films
Warner Bros. short films
American comedy short films
Films produced by Samuel Sax
1930s American films